The West Indies cricket team toured England in the 1969 season to play a three-match Test series against England. England won the series 2–0 with one match drawn. After this, England would not win another test series against the West Indies for 31 years.

The West Indian tour was scheduled for the first half of the English cricket season, and the weather for much of May 1969 was damp and cold. A second touring side, from New Zealand, played three Tests against England in the second half of the season – see the article New Zealand cricket team in England in 1969.

The West Indies team
The touring team was captained by Gary Sobers. Lance Gibbs was the vice-captain, although Basil Butcher acted as captain in a couple of the matches.

The full team was:

 Gary Sobers, captain
 Lance Gibbs, vice-captain
 Philbert Blair
 Basil Butcher
 Steve Camacho
 Joey Carew
 Charlie Davis
 Michael Findlay
 Maurice Foster
 Roy Fredericks
 Jackie Hendriks
 Vanburn Holder
 Clive Lloyd
 Pascall Roberts
 John Shepherd
 Grayson Shillingford

Only five players – Sobers, Gibbs, Butcher, Carew and Hendriks – had been on the previous tour of England in 1966. There were seven players with no previous Test experience in the party: five of them – Findlay, Foster, Holder, Shepherd and Shillingford – made their Test debuts in this series. The other two, Blair and Roberts, never played Test match cricket.

Notable absentees were Rohan Kanhai (injured) and wicketkeeper Deryck Murray, who would not be released for the full tour by Nottinghamshire.

The Test Matches

First Test at Old Trafford, June 12–17, 1969

England's success was built on 128 from Geoffrey Boycott, who shared a 112 opening partnership with John Edrich (58) and a third wicket 128 with Tom Graveney, who scored 75 in his 79th and final Test, during which he was 42 years old. West Indies dropped eight catches on the first day alone. Basil D'Oliveira (51) and the tail took the total beyond 400 and West Indies were soon five for two with both openers gone. David Brown and John Snow each took four wickets and no West Indian batsman reached 35. England captain Ray Illingworth enforced the follow-on, and despite consistent batting by the upper order, with 64 from Fredericks, 44 from Carew, 48 from Butcher and 48 also from Sobers, the deficit was only just cleared.

Second Test at Lord's, June 26-July 1, 1969

Batsmen dominated in sunny conditions. West Indies opened with 106 from Camacho (67) and Fredericks (63) and Davis hit 103 in 375 minutes. At 61 for five, England were in trouble, but debutant John Hampshire hit 107 and shared a 128-run sixth wicket partnership with Alan Knott, and then captain Ray Illingworth hit his first Test century, 113, and John Snow contributed only nine to a last-wicket partnership of 84. West Indies batted brightly, with Fredericks making 60 and Lloyd 70, and Sobers, batting with a runner, contributed an unbeaten 50 before declaring, setting England 322 to win in five hours. They made too slow a start, so that when Phil Sharpe (86) and opener Boycott (106) accelerated with a partnership of 126 in 90 minutes, they had left too little time to complete the task.

Third Test at Headingley, July 10–15, 1969

A slow pitch and damp conditions favoured the bowlers. Edrich's 79 and 40s from D'Oliveira and Knott led England to 223, but no West Indian managed more than 35. Shepherd was unable to bat in West Indies' first innings and could not bowl in England's second, where all players except Boycott made 15 or more, but none reached 40. Set 303 to win in better conditions, West Indies looked to be on course when Camacho, with 71, and Butcher (91) put on 108 for the third wicket, which fell at 177. At 219 for three, Butcher, Sobers (for a duck), Lloyd and Shepherd went for the addition of just nine runs and the tail was able to prolong the match only an hour into the last day.

See also
 Playfair Cricket Annual, 1970 edition
 Wisden Cricketers' Almanack, 1970 edition

References

External links
 CricketArchive

1969 in English cricket
1969 in West Indian cricket
International cricket competitions from 1960–61 to 1970
1969